Interrupted Streams  Zramim Ktu'im) is a  2010 documentary film co-directed by Swiss Alexandre Goetschmann and Academy Award Nominee Israeli Guy Davidi.

Synopsis
Paths of lives are crossed in one village in the West Bank. Along the broken water pipelines, villagers walk on their courses towards an indefinite future. Israel that controls the water, supplies only a small amount of water, and when the water streams are not certain nothing can evolve. The control over the water pressure not only dominates every aspect of life but also dominates the spirit. Bil'in, without spring water, is one of the first villages of the West Bank where a modern water infrastructure was set up. Many villagers took it as a sign of progress, others as a source of bitterness. The pipe-water was used to influence the people so they would co-operate with Israel's intelligence. The rip tore down the village. Returning to the ancient technique of collecting rainwater-using pits could be the villagers’ way to express independence but the relations between people will doubtfully be healed.

Awards
The Film won the "David Silver Camera" Award of the Warsaw Jewish Film Festival.

External links

IMDB Title

2010 films
2010s Arabic-language films
2010s Hebrew-language films
Israeli documentary films
2010 documentary films
Documentary films about the Israeli–Palestinian conflict
Documentary films about water and the environment
Films directed by Guy Davidi
2010 multilingual films
Israeli multilingual films